The FCW Florida Tag Team Championship was a professional wrestling tag team championship owned and promoted by Florida Championship Wrestling, (FCW), a former developmental territory of WWE. It was contested for in their tag team division. The championship was created and debuted on February 23, 2008 at a FCW house show.

The first champions were The Puerto Rican Nightmares (Eddie Colón and Eric Pérez) who won a one night tag team tournament by defeating Steve Lewington and Heath Miller in the finals to become the inaugural champions. In August 2012, the championship was retired when FCW was closed and the NXT brand was created, being replaced by in favor with NXT Tag Team Championship in early 2013 with Rick Victor and Brad Maddox becoming the final champions after defeating CJ Parker and Jason Jordan on July 28, 2012 in Melbourne, Florida, to win the titles.

Overall, there were 26 different championship teams, and 45 individual champions with the tag team of The Puerto Rican Nightmares (Eddie Colón and Eric Pérez) holding the most reigns at three. Joe Hennig/Michael McGillicutty, hold most reigns by a single competitor, with four. Johnny Curtis and Tyler Reks hold the longest reign at 140 days, in addition, Curtis holds the longest combined reign individually at 224 days. Justin Gabriel and Kris Logan have the shortest reign as a team at less than one day, due to them winning and losing the titles during the same FCW television taping event.

Reigns

Combined reigns
By team

By wrestler

Footnotes

References

State professional wrestling championships
WWE tag team championships
Tag Team Championship